Angel is a hentai manga series written and illustrated by U-Jin. The original manga series met with controversy in 1990–1991 in Japan and was retired from its magazine serialization. It was adapted into an OVA of the same name and a sequel called Angel: the women whom delivery host Kosuke Atami healed. The manga was also succeeded by a manga called Angel: the women whom delivery host Kosuke Atami healed, and succeeded again by another manga called Angel: the women whom delivery host Kosuke Atami healed season 2.

Plot

Story

The story is about the adventures of sexually driven boy Kosuke Atami and his friend Shizuka. It's a gag comedy with strong touches of eroticism, where the main concept is how Kosuke helps people through the story.

Characters

Original manga publication
Angel, also known as Angel: Highschool Sexual Bad Boys & Girls Story (prior to the Japanese controversy), Angel: Delight Slight Light Kiss Story (after it resumed serialization but before its complete ban) and currently Angel: Sexual boys and girls highschool story (in order to differentiate it from the sequels), started its publication in the magazine Weekly Young Sunday published by Shogakukan. Because of the controversy, its serialization was interrupted in 1991 and only three volumes were published by Shogakukan. It was later fully reprinted by Cybele Publishing (also known as Cybele Shuppan), which also included two new volumes for a total of 7 volumes, although Cybele volumes had in fact less pages than Shogakukan volumes. In the cover of the Cybele volumes, the legend "We came back!" can be read above the title, in reference to the incident that provoked its temporal ban. The manga was published in Taiwan by company Li-Yi, in France by Tonkam and in Spain by Norma Editorial in Cybele's edition.

Volumes
Shogakukan (Young Sunday Comics, 1989–1990)

Cybele Publishing (Cybele Comics, 1993) This version includes several autostereograms. Since foreign versions were based on this one, they also include the autostereograms.

Cybele Publishing (Cybele Bunko, 1995–1996)

Ohzora Publishing (also known as Chu Shuppan) (Missy Comics, 2007–2008)

Along with this volumes, there is another collection which combines Angel with  Konai Shasei, another manga by U-Jin. The collection is simply called . Instead of a regular numbering, each volume has a different subtitle.

Ohzora Publishing (Missy Comics, 2006–2007)

The series is also available in ebook format by eBookJapan.

Media

OVAs

Angel 
It was later re-released by Tairiku Shobo.

New Angel 
The second OVA consisted of five episodes. It was produced by Pink Pineapple and Triple X.

In the US the OVA has been released by SoftCel Pictures. It was originally released in VHS format in 1995, 1996 and 1998 and it was released in both uncut and edited versions for the first four episodes.

Shin Angel was also released in France, in VHS by Katsumi vidéo and in DVD by Anime Erotik, and also in Spain in VHS and DVD by Manga Films (although only the first 4 episodes were released by Manga Films) and on TV by Arait Multimedia.

Video games

Live-action films
Two adult live-action films based on the manga were produced. Both films have the participation of Japanese Adult Video actresses Yui Kawana and Mizuki Kanno and were released by the company dez.

Manga sequels
Also created by U-Jin, this manga follows the new adventures of Kosuke Atami, now a divorced 34-year-old man who works as a host and helps people in a similar way as he did as a highschooler.

Following the previous sequel, in 2008, also in Nihon Bungeisha's Weekly Manga Goraku, the manga titled Angel season 2: the women whom delivery host Kosuke Atami healed, more commonly known as Angel season 2, was released. Also done by U-Jin, the manga follows the same premise as the previous manga series.

Reception

Criticism and controversy in Japan

The manga depicted high schoolers in several sexual situations. In the aftermath of the Saitama serial kidnapping murders of young girls, a moral panic against otaku was prevalent and several manga were singled out for their contents, among them Angel. PTAs managed to force the suspension of the manga for a while and volume 3 became the last by Shogakukan and the tankōbon became banned. The problem centered in housewives who believed that Angel was too sexually explicit for a seinen publication and that the manga had become pretty popular.

While the manga was still being serialized in the magazine, U-Jin included a "message from the author" chapter as a form of protest. When it temporary resumed serialization, the sexual content was reduced and the subtitle changed to Delight Slight Light Kiss Story, until it was finally banned.

Youth controversy in France
Upon the release of the third volume in France, Angel was banned from exhibition in stores. The argument of anti-manga people, relayed by the press at the time, was that the manga is dangerous for youth because of eroticism and violence it diffuses. Tonkam, however, for which Angel was the first erotic manga, finished the translation of the 7 volumes.

New Angel
Stig Høgset, writing for THEM Anime Reviews, found New Angel technically good, as the art and animation were good, but felt the story was "boring and stupid". Chris Beveridge noted that the episodes were not scripted by U-Jin, thus lacking some of his distinctive style, and feels that it is an example of a hentai series which merely "spices up" a "regular" anime series. Bamboo Dong, writing for Anime News Network, felt that the writing of the series made it "fun to watch", with humour and interesting backgrounds for the female characters, and noted that the sex scenes are "pretty graphic". Bamboo Dong felt the transition between non-sex scenes and sex scenes was not smooth in the second volume.

Notes

References

External links

Angel (manga)  at eBookJapan
Angel Collection at Kitty Media

1988 manga
1990s erotic films
1990 anime OVAs
1991 anime OVAs
1997 films
2006 manga
2008 manga
Japanese adult animated films
Hentai anime and manga
Japanese direct-to-video films
1990s Japanese-language films
Kitty Media
Nihon Bungeisha manga
Shogakukan manga
Seinen manga